Atlanta Jewish Academy was created by the merger of Greenfield Hebrew Academy and Yeshiva Atlanta on July 1, 2014.

The school is the first Infant through 12th grade Jewish day school in Greater Atlanta. It previously had two campuses, the lower school located in Sandy Springs and the upper school located in Doraville. However, in August 2017, the upper school moved into a new building added on to the Sandy Springs location.

Atlanta Jewish Academy is accredited by AdvancED (formerly SACS) and the Southern Association of Independent Schools (SAIS).

The first head of school was Rabbi Pinchos Hecht. The second head of school is Rabbi Ari Leubitz, who began his term on August 1, 2016.

See also
History of the Jews in Atlanta

References

External links
 

Jewish schools in the United States
Schools in Sandy Springs, Georgia
Schools in DeKalb County, Georgia
Modern Orthodox Jewish day schools in the United States
Private K-12 schools in Sandy Springs, Georgia
2014 establishments in Georgia (U.S. state)
Educational institutions established in 2014